Tir Kola (also Romanized as Tīr Kolā) is a village in Dasht-e Sar Rural District, Dabudasht District, Amol County, Mazandaran Province, Iran. At the 2006 census, its population was 267, in 71 families.

References 

Populated places in Amol County